River Bend Nuclear Generating Station is a nuclear power station on a  site near St. Francisville, Louisiana in West Feliciana Parish, approximately  north of Baton Rouge. The station has one sixth generation General Electric boiling water reactor that has a nominal gross electric output of about 1010 MWe. Commercial operation began on June 16, 1986. In 2003, owners applied and were approved for a power upgrade of approximately 52 megawatts in 2003. The nameplate capacity is 974 MW.

River Bend is operated by Entergy, which owns 100% of the station through its subsidiary, Entergy Gulf States Louisiana. The plant's operating license will expire in 2045.

The Site Vice President is Kent Scott, the General Manager of Plant Operations is Bonnie Bryant, and the Senior Operations Manager is Danny James. The station employs 870 full time employees.

Units 2 and 3
The River Bend site was originally designed to have two identical units. Construction on Unit 1 began in 1973, but Unit 2 barely broke ground, with only the containment base mat and some underground piping installed. In 1984, plans to construct Unit 2 were officially abandoned.

On September 25, 2008, Entergy filed a Combined Construction and Operating License (COL) application with the Nuclear Regulatory Commission (NRC) for Unit 3, a new nuclear reactor at River Bend. The 1550 MWe Economic Simplified Boiling Water Reactor (ESBWR) was the selected design. The reactor's cost was estimated at $6.2 billion.

On January 9, 2009, Entergy indefinitely postponed work towards the license and construction of Unit 3.

Electricity Production

Surrounding population

The 2010 U.S. population within  of River Bend was 23,466, an increase of 11.1 percent in a decade, according to an analysis of U.S. Census data for msnbc.com. The 2010 U.S. population within  was 951,103, an increase of 11.2 percent since 2000. Cities within 50 miles include Baton Rouge (25 miles to city center).

Seismic risk
The Nuclear Regulatory Commission's estimate of the risk each year of an earthquake intense enough to cause core damage to the reactor at River Bend was 1 in 40,000, according to an NRC study published in August 2010.

Safety record
Unlike the Waterford Nuclear Generating Station downriver in Hahnville, River Bend continued operation throughout Hurricane Katrina in 2005.
The plant was shut down during Hurricane Gustav in 2008.

See also 

 Nuclear Power 2010 Program
 Waterford Nuclear Generating Station, in St. Charles Parish, Louisiana

Notes

References

External links

Energy infrastructure completed in 1986
Nuclear power plants in Louisiana
Buildings and structures in West Feliciana Parish, Louisiana
Nuclear power stations using Economic Simplified Boiling Water Reactors
Entergy
Nuclear power stations with proposed reactors
1986 establishments in Louisiana